Parochromolopis gielisi is a moth in the family Epermeniidae. It was described by Reinhard Gaedike in 2010. It is found in Argentina.

References

Epermeniidae
Moths of South America
Arthropods of Argentina
Moths described in 2010